Peziza vesiculosa is a species of apothecial fungus belonging to the family Pezizaceae. This is a common species of Europe, with scattered records in other parts of the world. It is found on nutrient-rich soils, rotting straw and manure and can often be seen on compost heaps. The species is considered poisonous.

References

Further reading

External links

Peziza vesiculosa at GBIF

Fungi described in 1790
Fungi of Europe
Pezizaceae
Poisonous fungi